KRCU at Southeast Missouri State University includes three stations that provide news and music programming to nearly 1.9 million people in its service regions of Southeast Missouri, Southern Illinois and the Parkland.

KRCU is located in and licensed to Cape Girardeau, Missouri, on 90.9 FM, and is a 6,500 watt station. KRCU's signal covers Cape Girardeau, Jackson, Sikeston, Marble Hill, Perryville and several communities in southern Illinois.

It signed on with 10 watts of power as a student-run college station in March 1976. In 1981 it increased power to 100 watts, and in 1988 it began transitioning to a public radio format. In November 1990, KRCU became an NPR member station. In 1992 KRCU increased power again, to 6,000 watts. It has since increased to 6,500 watts, allowing the signal to be heard within a 50 mile radius.

KRCU has two repeater stations: KSEF and KDMC-FM. KSEF 88.9 FM is located in Farmington, Missouri and is a 20,000 watt station. KSEF's signal covers Farmington, Park Hills, Ste. Genevieve, Fredericktown, Potosi, Festus, and reaches into South County St. Louis. Signing on in September 2006, KSEF was previously licensed to Farmington, Missouri until changed to nearby Sainte Genevieve, Missouri in May 2010. KDMC-FM 88.7 is located in Van Buren, Missouri and is a 100,000 watt station. KDMC-FM's signal covers Van Buren, Poplar Bluff, Piedmont, Eminence, and Doniphan. KDMC-FM signed on in May 2020 after the facility was acquired from the Here's Help Network.

KRCU broadcasts 24 hours a day from facilities located on the campus of Southeast Missouri State University in Cape Girardeau and provides practical broadcast experience for students of the University.

KRCU is affiliated with NPR, PRX, and APM. These programming services provide many public radio favorites like All Things Considered, Morning Edition, 1A and Live from Here. Popular local programs include A Harte Appetite, Caffe Concerto, Discover Nature, and Your Folk Connection.

External links
KRCU/KSEF homepage
KRCU online feed

RCU
NPR member stations